"To the Top" is the fifth and final single released by Australian singer Peter Andre from his self-titled debut album. The single was released in April 1994, through Melodian Records. The single peaked at #46 on the Australian Singles Chart. The song was also re-written to contain sport-related lyrics, and this version was used as the official theme for the 1994 FIFA World Cup. This version appears on the second physical single.

Track listing

CD1 / Cassette 1
 "To the Top" (Slammin' Jam Radio Edit) – 4:02
 "To the Top" (Album Version) – 4:21
 "To the Top" (Instrumental) – 4:21
 "To the Top" (Slammin' Jam Extended Mix) – 6:15

CD2 / Cassette 2
 "To the Top" (World Cup '94 Version) – 4:11
 "Gonna Get to You" (Metropolis Mix) – 3:58
 "To the Top" (SBS Mix) – 4:27
 "To the Top" (Take It Higher Mix) – 6:18

Charts

References

1994 singles
1993 songs
Peter Andre songs
Songs written by Peter Andre